Les Novices is a 1970 French film starring Brigitte Bardot.

Cast
 Brigitte Bardot as Agnès
 Annie Girardot as Mona Lisa
 Jean Carmet as le client au chien
 Noël Roquevert as le sadique
 Jacques Jouanneau as le client de Mona Lisa
 Jess Hahn as l'Américain
 Clément Michu as le client en double file
 Jacques Duby as le chauffeur de l'ambulance 
 Antonio Passalia as le play-boy
 Dominique Zardi as l'agent du commissariat

References

External links

1970 films
Films scored by François de Roubaix
French comedy-drama films
Films with screenplays by Paul Gégauff
1970s French films